Samsung Cup may refer to:

Samsung Fire Cup, international Go competition
Samsung Hauzen Cup South Korean football competition
Samsung Securities Cup, professional tennis tournament